William Albert Wirt (1874–1938) was a superintendent of schools in Gary, Indiana.  Wirt developed the Gary Plan for the more efficient use of school facilities, a reform of the Progressive Movement that was widely adopted in other cities.

As superintendent of education
In 1907, Wirt became superintendent of schools in Gary and began implementing his educational values in the local schools. He initiated teacher hiring standards, designed school buildings, lengthened the school day, and organized the schools according to his ideals. The core of the schools' organization in Gary centered upon the platoon or work-study-play system and Americanizing the 63.4 percent of children with parents who were immigrants. Above the primary grades, students were divided into two platoons—one platoon used the academic classrooms (which were deemphasized), while the second platoon was divided between the shops, nature studies, auditorium, gymnasium, and outdoor facilities split between girls and boys. "Girls learned cooking, sewing, and bookkeeping while the boys learning metalwork, cabinetry, woodworking, painting, printing, shoemaking, and plumbing." In the Gary plan, all of the school equipment remained in use during the entire school day; Rather than opening up new schools for the overwhelming population of students, it was hoped that the "Gary Plan would save the city money by utilizing all rooms in existing schools by rotating children through classrooms, auditoriums, playgrounds, and gymnasiums."

The platoon system gained acceptance in Gary and received national attention during the early decades of the twentieth century. In 1914, the New York City hired Wirt as a part-time consultant to introduce the work-study-play system in the public schools. In the following three years, however, the Gary system encountered resistance from students, parents, and labor leaders concerned that the plan simply trained children to work in factories and the fact that Gary's Plan was in predominantly Jewish areas. "In January 1916, the Board of Education released a report finding students attending Gary Plan schools performed worse than those in 'non-Garyuzed schools' ."

Attack against the New Deal programs
In addition to these concerns, William Wirt launched an attack upon Franklin D. Roosevelt's New Deal programs, charging that the New Deal threatened American individualism by attempting government planning of the economy. He wrote pamphlets, articles, and addresses on the economy, particularly regarding the manipulation of the dollar to solve the economic crisis. Finally, Wirt accused the New Deal of being infiltrated by communists designing the collapse of the American system.  His ideas appeared in his pamphlet America Must Lose by a “Planned Economy,” the Stepping-Stone to a Regimented State (1934).

The pamphlet made him the target of a libel suit.

See also
 Wirt High School, established in Gary, Indiana in 1939, named after Wirt
 Alice Barrows

References

Further reading
 Cohen, Ronald D. and Mohl, Raymond A. The Paradox of Progressive Education: The Gary Plan and Urban Schooling, (Port Washington, New York: Kennikat Press Corporation, 1979), p. 13.
 Lane, James B. City of the Century: A History of Gary, Indiana (Indiana University Press, 1978), p. 65.
 Weiner, M. F. (2010). Power, protest, and the public schools: Jewish and African-American struggles in New York City. New Brunswick: Rutgers University Press.

External links

 Gary Community School Corporation
 IUN: William A. and Mildred H. Wirt Papers
 City of Gary, Indiana Official Page 

1874 births
1938 deaths
American educational theorists
School superintendents in Indiana
DePauw University alumni
people from Bluffton, Indiana
people from Gary, Indiana
Old Right (United States)